Dean Park may refer to:

Dean Park, New South Wales, Australia, a suburb of the City of Blacktown
Dean Park Cricket Ground, a cricket ground in Bournemouth, England
A park in Kilmarnock, Scotland